The Four: Battle for Stardom, also known as The Four, was an American reality television music competition series broadcast on Fox. Premiering on January 4, 2018, the show was eventually renewed for a second season which aired on June 7, 2018. The winner, determined by a studio audience and panelists, is awarded a recording contract with Republic Records, a division of Universal Music Group, and named iHeartRadio's "On the Verge" artist. The winners of the first two seasons are Evvie McKinney and James Graham.

The show’s panelists originally included rapper, record producer and music manager Sean Combs, rapper and music producer DJ Khaled, singer-songwriter Meghan Trainor, and music executive Charlie Walk. However, Walk withdrew from the series prior to the season one finale following sexual assault allegations against him. Subsequent episodes have starred the other three panelists.

Format
Based on an Israeli format called The Four, The Four is a singing competition that differs among similar talent competitions, in that there are no stage auditions. The artists, also known as the challengers, are held in the holding room before singing in front of a live studio audience and the judges. The panel of people in the music industry ultimately decides the best challengers that compete against "The Four". Their decision must be unanimous. The members consist of vocalists of varying genres, and they must win challenges against new artists to keep their seat and remain as a member of "The Four". At the end of six weeks, the last singer standing among "The Four" wins the competition.

There are two distinct rounds in The Four. In the performances round, new challengers must earn their seat by performing in front of a live studio audience, the panel of judges and "The Four". After the performance, the judges then vote and make a "Yes" or "No" decision, signifying the challenger's fate in the competition. If a challenger receives a unanimous four blue rings on stage (four "Yes" votes from the panel), they advance to the next round of the competition. A red ring given to the challenger signifies a "No", ending his or her time in the competition. Artists who advance to the challenge round can compete against a member of "The Four" for their seat. In a sing-off style battle, the challenger and "The Four" member sing against each other for their seat. After the challenge, the studio audience then votes to decide which of the two should remain in the competition. The winner locks his or her seat for the rest of the night and cannot be challenged again until the next episode.

Series overview

Notes

 Walk withdrew from the show following episode 5.

Season synopsis
Winners and runners-up are indicated in gold and silver, respectively.

Season 1

The first season of The Four premiered on January 4, 2018, and concluded on February 8, 2018. After six episodes, Evvie McKinney was announced as the winner of the season, with Candice Boyd as the runner-up. The final group of "The Four" also included Vincint Cannady and Zhavia Ward.

Season 2

The second and final season of The Four premiered on June 7, 2018, and concluded on August 2, 2018. The first members of "The Four" were announced on May 9, 2018. They included Carvena Jones, James Graham,  Sharaya J, and Stephanie Zelaya. Following eight episodes, James Graham was announced as the winner of the season, with Sharaya J as the runner-up. Leah Jenea and Whitney Reign were finalists. Runner-up Sharaya J. remained undefeated throughout the entirety of the season.

Reception

Awards and nominations

Ratings
The first season of The Four was Fox's most watched and highest-rated new unscripted series in nearly four years.

References

External links
 
 

2010s American reality television series
2018 American television series debuts
2010s American music television series
Music competitions in the United States
English-language television shows
Fox Broadcasting Company original programming
Television series by ITV Studios
American television series based on Israeli television series
2018 American television series endings